George Hargreaves (born November 12, 1952) is a landscape architect. Under his design direction, the work of his firm has received numerous national awards and has been published and exhibited nationally and internationally. He was an artist in residence at the American Academy of Rome in 2009. Hargreaves and his firm designed numerous sites including the master plan for the Sydney 2000 Olympics, The Brightwater Waste Water Treatment Facility in Seattle, Washington, and University of Cincinnati Master Plan.

Education

According to Ken Gwertz's article "Landscape Alchemist," George Hargreaves' interest in Landscape Architecture was partially due to a summer trip that he went on when he was 18 years old. During the trip to the Rocky Mountains, George Hargreaves climbed Flat Top Mountain where he experienced a life changing scene. Hargreaves describes the sense, "It wasn't just the mountains or the trees or any of the individual elements. It was something about the sense of space itself. When I got back home I tried to explain this to my uncle...and he said, 'Have you ever thought about going into landscape architecture?'" In 1973, George Hargreaves attended the School of Environment and Design at the University of Georgia. Four years later, he graduated second in his class, magna cum laude, with a Bachelor of Landscape Architecture. Soon after getting his bachelor's degree, George went to Harvard University Graduate School of Design. He graduated with distinction and received a master's degree in Landscape Architecture.

Professional experience

In 1983, Hargreaves Associates, now Hargreaves Jones, was founded. George and Hargreaves Associates have worked on many well known designs over the years. George Hargreaves is an important part of every design.

Hargreaves Jones (previously Hargreaves Associates) is a professional consulting firm composed of landscape architects and planners with offices in San Francisco, California, and Cambridge, Massachusetts. The work includes a wide range of urban design, waterfronts, public parks, academic, corporate, institutional, and residential planning and design projects. According to Hargreaves, "Convention is easy to slip into, to keep making the same pictures. What I try to find are those magic moments of clarity when you hear what the site is whispering to you." Landscape Alchemist

In the Introduction of the 2009 publication on his practice, Landscape Alchemy, Hargreaves cites that the firm seldom encounters project sites that are a greenfield or “natural” but are more likely to be brownfields, often flat, devoid of any significant vegetation or other natural features, yet close to city centers. Mostly late 20th century and early 21st century sites, they differ greatly from the majority of the sites for the great parks realized from the 17th to early 20th century that had much more obvious character  where glacial terrain with remnant countryside provided what Hargreaves likes to call “good bones”. Additionally, he points out that “our design strategies is a continuing search for the way to conceptually enter the site and create bones where there are none”, and that while each Hargreaves project integrates sustainability, phenomena and process, site histories, adjacencies and overlays, “none should operate singularly - they all interact on the same site as we strive to put bones in our projects that will give them life for decades or centuries to come”.

At his presentation to the Forum for Urban Design Spring Conference 2009: the 21st Century Park & Contemporary City held at the Modern Museum of Art, Hargreaves emphasized that "distressed sites, whether abandoned, polluted, neglected, or all three, are the dross from which 21st Century dreams are woven".

Academic experience

George Hargreaves started his academic career shortly after he started Hargreaves Associates. He first taught at universities such as Cal Poly, University of Illinois Champaign, and University of Virginia Charlottesville. In 1986, George began to teach at Harvard University Graduate School of Design where he became a tenured professor and continued teaching there for over twenty years. He was the Chair for the Department of Landscape Architecture from 1996 through 2003. Prior to resigning from his position at Harvard to focus on his practice, he was the Peter Louis Hornbeck Professor in Practice of Landscape Architecture and taught advanced and theoretical design classes and core studios.

An important piece of his academic work is the book he co-wrote with Julia Czerniak. The book is Large Parks. Large Parks is compilation of eight essays on large urban parks. These essays talk about the complexity of the parks and how they part of society. Large Parks is only the latest in a long line of publications that he has written and was awarded the J. B. Jackson Book Prize by the Foundation for Landscape Studies for having contributed significantly to the understanding of landscape studies.

Projects
21st Century Waterfront, Chattanooga, Tennessee
300 Spear Street San Francisco, California
Abu Dhabi Beaches, Abu Dhabi, Dubai
American Indian Cultural Center, Oklahoma City, Oklahoma
Arts of Collin County, Allen, Texas
Astir Palace Hotel, Athens, Greece
Baton Rouge Riverfront, Baton Rouge, Louisiana
Bayfront Park, San Francisco, California
Belo Garden, Dallas, Texas
Bransten Residence, Bolinas, California
Brightwater Wastewater Treatment Facility, Seattle, Washington 
Byxbee Park, Palo Alto, California
Candlestick Point State Recreation Area, San Francisco, California
Chattanooga Renaissance Park, Chattanooga, TN
Chennai International Airport Terminal, Chennai, India
Banks|Cincinnati Riverfront Park, Cincinnati, Ohio
Circular Quay, Sydney, Australia 
College of Santa Fe Master Plan, Santa Fe, New Mexico
County Administration Center Waterfront Park, San Diego, California 
Crissy Field, San Francisco, California 
Crescent Park, New Orleans, LA
Dallas Downtown Parks Master Plan, Dallas, Texas 
Davenport Arts Walk, Davenport, Iowa
Dayton Residence, Minneapolis, Minnesota
Discovery Green, Houston, Texas
Drexel University - 32nd Street Pedestrian Mall, Philadelphia, Pennsylvania
Duke University - Student Center Plaza Durham, North Carolina
East Darling Harbour Competition, Sydney, Australia
Elizabeth Caruthers Park, Portland, Oregon
Exploration Place, Wichita, Kansas
Fort Washington Way, Cincinnati, Ohio
General Motors Global Headquarters Riverfront Plaza and Promenade, Detroit, Michigan
General Motors Tech Center Master Plan, Warren, Michigan
Guadalupe River Park, San Jose, California
Hewlett Packard Courtyard, Palo Alto, California
Hunter Point Shipyard Waterfront Park, San Francisco, California
Knoxville South Waterfront Development, Knoxville, Tennessee
Lake Union Park, Seattle, Washington
Los Angeles State Historic Park, Los Angeles, California
Louisville Waterfront Park Phase I, Louisville, Kentucky
Louisville Waterfront Park Phase II, Louisville, Kentucky
Metropolis Mixed-Use Development, Los Angeles, California
Mission Rock Seawall Lot 337, San Francisco, California
Monongahela Wharf, Pittsburgh, Pennsylvania
Nashville Riverfront Park, Nashville, Tennessee
National Museum of Emerging Science and Innovation, Tokyo, Japan
New Orleans Riverfront: Reinventing the Crescent, New Orleans, Louisiana
Native American Cultural Center and Museum, Oklahoma City, Oklahoma
One Island East, Hong Kong, China
Parkview West, Chicago, Illinois
Parque do Tejo e Trancao - Expo '98, Lisbon, Portugal
Pennsylvania Avenue Streetscape, Washington D.C.
Penn's Landing, Philadelphia, PA
Plaza de Cesar Chavez San Jose, California
Poplar Point, Washington D.C.
Reflections at Keppel Bay, Keppel Bay, Singapore
Ritz-Carlton Hotel and Residences, Washington D.C.
San Diego Community Plan Update, San Diego, California
San Luis Rey River Park Master Plan, San Diego, California
San Ramon City Center, San Ramon, California
Shepherds Bush Common Competition, London, UK
Shaw Center for the Arts Baton Rouge, Louisiana
Singapore Marina Bay, Marina Bay, Singapore
Smith Residence, Big Sky, Montana
South Point Park, Miami Beach, Florida
Sydney Olympics 2000, Sydney, Australia
Taikoo Hui, Guangzhou, China
Trinity River, Dallas, Texas
T. Tyler Potterfield Memorial Bridge, Richmond, VA
University of Cincinnati Master Plan, Cincinnati, Ohio
University of Cincinnati - Aronoff Center, Cincinnati, Ohio
University of Cincinnati - Campus Green, Cincinnati, Ohio
University of Cincinnati - Library Square, Cincinnati, Ohio
University of Cincinnati - Main Street, Cincinnati, Ohio
University of Cincinnati - McMicken Commons, Cincinnati, Ohio
University of Cincinnati - Sigma Sigma Commons, Cincinnati, Ohio
University of Cincinnati - University Commons, Cincinnati, Ohio
University of Cincinnati - Zimmer Plaza, Cincinnati, Ohio
Villa Zapu, Napa, California
Oklahoma City Waterfront Park, Oklahoma City, Oklahoma
William J. Clinton Presidential Center and Park,  Little Rock, Arkansas
Xochimilco, Mexico City, Mexico
Zaryadye Park, Moscow, Russian Federation

See also
Harvard University Graduate School of Design. 
List of schools of landscape architecture
Landscape architect

References
Gewertz, Ken. "Landscape Alchemist." The Harvard University Gazette. 6 Feb. 1997. 26 Oct. 2006 <http://news.harvard.edu/gazette/1997/02.06/LandscapeAlchem.html>. 
Hargreaves Associates. Hargreaves Associates. 27 Oct. 2007 <http://hargreaves.com/firm/index.htm>. 
Harvard University Graduate School of Design. "Faculty Profile." Harvard University Graduate School of Design. 27 Oct. 2007 <http://www.gsd.harvard.edu/people/faculty/hargreaves/index.html>. 
Princeton Architecture Press. Princeton Press. 27 Oct. 2007 <http://www.papress.com/bookpage.tpl?isbn=1568986246>
http://ladprofile.weebly.com/george-hargreaves-1952.html
https://www.linkedin.com/company/hargreaves-associates/about/
https://landscapetheory1.wordpress.com/tag/george-hargreaves/

1952 births
Living people
Harvard Graduate School of Design alumni
Harvard Graduate School of Design faculty
University of Georgia alumni